David Allan Coe (born September 6, 1939) is an American singer and songwriter. Coe took up music after spending much of his early life in reform schools and prisons, and first became notable for busking in Nashville. He initially played mostly in the blues style, before transitioning to country music, becoming a major part of the 1970s outlaw country scene. His biggest hits include "You Never Even Called Me by My Name", "Longhaired Redneck",  "The Ride", "Mona Lisa Lost Her Smile", and "She Used to Love Me a Lot".

His most popular songs performed by others are the number-one hits "Would You Lay With Me (In a Field of Stone)"  sung by Tanya Tucker and Johnny Paycheck's rendition of "Take This Job and Shove It". The latter inspired the movie of the same name. Coe's rebellious attitude, wild image, and unconventional lifestyle set him apart from other country performers, both winning him legions of fans and hindering his mainstream success by alienating the music industry establishment. Coe continues to be a popular performer on the country music circuit.

Biography 
Coe was born in Akron, Ohio, on September 6, 1939. His favorite singer as a child was Johnny Ace. After being sent to the Starr Commonwealth For Boys reform school at the age of nine, he spent much of the next 20 years in correctional facilities, including three years at the Ohio Penitentiary. Coe claimed he received encouragement to begin writing songs from Screamin' Jay Hawkins, with whom he had spent time in prison.

After concluding another prison term in 1967, Coe embarked on a music career in Nashville, living in a hearse which he parked in front of the Ryman Auditorium while he performed on the street. He caught the attention of Shelby Singleton, owner of the independent record label Plantation Records and signed a contract with his label. Coe is a retired member of the Louisville, Kentucky, chapter of the Outlaws Motorcycle Club.

He is the father of Tyler Mahan Coe, the creator of the Cocaine & Rhinestones podcast, which chronicles the history of country music.

According to news sources, he owes over $300,000 in child support.

Music career

Early career (1970–1975) 

Early in 1970, Coe released his debut album, Penitentiary Blues, followed by a tour with Grand Funk Railroad. In October 1971, he signed as an exclusive writer with Pete and Rose Drake's publishing company Windows Publishing Company, Inc. in Nashville, Tennessee, where he remained until 1977. Although he developed a cult following with his performances, he was not able to develop any mainstream success, but other performers achieved charting success by recording songs Coe had written, including Billie Jo Spears' 1972 recordings "Souvenirs & California Mem'rys" and Tanya Tucker's 1973 single "Would You Lay With Me (In a Field of Stone)", which was a No. 1 hit and responsible for Coe becoming one of Nashville's hottest songwriters and Coe himself being signed by Columbia Records. Coe recorded his own version of the song for his second Columbia album, Once Upon a Rhyme, released in 1975. AllMusic writer Thom Jurek said of the song, "The amazing thing is that both versions are definitive."

Unlike Coe's first two albums, his third showed full commitment to country music, and Coe would play a part in the evolution of what would become known as outlaw country. The title of Coe's third album, The Mysterious Rhinestone Cowboy, refers to the gimmick Coe adopted several years before Glen Campbell had a hit with the song "Rhinestone Cowboy": dressing up in a rhinestone suit and wearing a Lone Ranger mask. The singer later recalled to Michael Buffalo Smith in 2004, "I guess I have to blame it on Mel Tillis. I met him when I first went to Nashville and he had an office down on Music Row. I was over there talking to him in his office, and he opened up the closet to get something and he had a whole closet full of rhinestone suits. I just freaked out on that. He looked at me and said ‘You like that shit, I don't even wear those, if you want ‘em take ‘em!' He gave me those rhinestone suits and I wore them everywhere." Coe maintained the idea for the mask came from his father:

Coe's second album Once Upon a Rhyme contains one of his biggest hits, "You Never Even Called Me by My Name", written by Steve Goodman and John Prine and which first appeared on Goodman's 1971 debut release. Coe's version became his first country Top 10 hit single, peaking at No. 8 in 1975, and includes a spoken epilogue where Coe relates a correspondence he had with Goodman, who stated the song he had written was the 'perfect country and western song'. Coe wrote back stating that no song could fit that description without mentioning a laundry list of clichés: "mama, or trains, or trucks, or prison, or getting drunk". Goodman's equally facetious response was an additional verse that incorporated all five of Coe's requirements, and upon receiving it, Coe acknowledged that the finished product was indeed the 'perfect country and western song' and included the last verse on the record:

I was drunk the day Mama got out of prisonAnd I went to pick 'er up in the rainBut before I could get to the station in my pickup truckShe got runned over by a damned ol' train

Coe was a featured performer in Heartworn Highways, a 1975 documentary film by James Szalapski. Other performers featured included Guy Clark, Townes Van Zandt, Rodney Crowell, Steve Young, Steve Earle, and the Charlie Daniels Band. Coe also wrote "Cocaine Carolina" for Johnny Cash and sang background vocals on the recording that appeared on Cash's 1975 album John R. Cash.

Outlaw years (1976–1982) 

By 1976, the outlaw country movement was in full swing as artists such as Waylon Jennings and Willie Nelson were finally enjoying massive commercial success after years of fighting to record their music their own way. Coe, however, was still somewhat an outsider, almost too outlaw for the outlaws, a predicament summed up well by AllMusic:

Longhaired Redneck was Coe's third album for Columbia in three years, and the first where he wrote or co-wrote all the songs; the outlaw country zeitgeist was summed up well in the title track, which recounts playing in a dive "where bikers stare at cowboys who are laughing at the hippies who are praying they'll get out of here alive".  The song, which has an unmistakable rock swagger, features Coe performing impressive imitations of Ernest Tubb, Bill Anderson, and Merle Haggard, making it irretrievably country as well, illustrating the dichotomy of what was being referred to as 'progressive' country music. Coe later said, "It was terminology that I'd made up at the time. I was trying to tell people that not everybody with long hair was a hippie. Not everyone was the kind of person that thought you could punch them out, take their money and that they'd say, 'I won't do nothin' about it'."

By 1977, the outlaw movement was nearing its apex, having seen the release of Willie Nelson's blockbuster album Red Headed Stranger and country music's first platinum selling album, Wanted! The Outlaws. Coe considered himself as integral as anyone in the evolution of the outlaw country genre, and began saying so in his music. As noted in AllMusic's review of the album, "On Rides Again, by trying to make a conscious outlaw record and aligning himself with the movement's two progenitors on the opening track, "Willie, Waylon, and Me"...Coe already set up self-parody unintentionally – something that continued to curse him." The songs on Rides Again cross-fade without the usual silences between tracks, which was unusual for country music, and feature Coe's heavily phased guitar. Coe was also permitted to use his own band on several tracks, a major concession for Columbia at the time. However, some of his peers resented Coe placing himself in such exalted company, and felt he was exploiting his relationship with his fellow outlaws. Jennings' drummer Richie Albright called Coe "a great, great songwriter. A great singer. But he could not tell the truth if it was better than a lie he'd made up. Waylon didn't make him comfortable enough to hang around. But Willie did. I was around Willie quite a bit and David Allan was with him eighty percent of the time.  Willie allowed him to hang around." Coe managed to maintain friendships with both Jennings and Nelson, despite the former's cool treatment of him at times. In his autobiography, Jennings mentions Coe once (in a chapter titled "The Outlaw Shit"), calling him "the most sincere of the bunch" of bandwagon jumpers, but contends "when it came to being an Outlaw, the worst thing he ever did was double-parking on Music Row", adding:

Throughout the rest of the decade, Coe released a string of strong recordings, some of which, such as Human Emotions (1978) and Spectrum VII (1979), were concept albums with each side of the discs given their own theme. 1978's Family Album contains Coe's rendition of "Take This Job and Shove It", a song he composed and which had been released by Johnny Paycheck in October 1977, becoming a monumental success. The song is a first person account of a man who has worked for fifteen years with no apparent reward, and it struck a chord with the public, even inspiring a 1981 film of the same name. Although Coe's name was credited, the assumption by many was that Paycheck, an acclaimed songwriter himself, composed the tune; this would feed into Coe's growing bitterness with the industry as another one of his peers exploded in popularity. Coe was further disenchanted when pop star Jimmy Buffett accused him of plagiarising his hit "Changes in Latitudes, Changes in Attitudes" for Coe's "Divers Do It Deeper". (Coe had been incorporating Caribbean sounds into his music, as is evident on his 1979 album Compass Point.) By 1980, Coe and producer Billy Sherrill set out to reach a wider audience and bring Coe back to the charts by inviting other singers and musicians to take part in the sessions for what would become I've Got Something to Say, which would boast contributions from Guy Clark, Bill Anderson, Dickey Betts (from The Allman Brothers Band), Kris Kristofferson, Larry Jon Wilson, and George Jones. This process was continued the following year on Invictus (Means) Unconquered, with Sherrill couching the songs in tasteful instrumentation that put the spotlight squarely on Coe's voice. (In his AllMusic review, Thom Jurek labelled it 'arguably the finest album of his career')

By 1981, the outlaw country movement waned as the slicker 'urban cowboy' era took hold in country music, typified by the Johnny Lee hit "Lookin' for Love", which critic Kurt Wolff panned as an example of 'watered-down cowboy music'. Coe was an important figure in the outlaw country genre, but judging by the sound of his recordings from this period, he had no interest in the trendy urban cowboy phase. Refusing to give into the flavor-of-the-month generic country 'talent', Coe stuck to what he knew and sharpened the edges. However, while scoring some moderate hits, mainstream success remained elusive. Coe's highest- charting single during this period was "Get a Little Dirt on Your Hands", a duet with Bill Anderson, which peaked at No. 45. As if aware of the compromises he had been making, Coe chose to close out his 1982 album D.A.C. with a suite of three songs that contained a short prologue:

Commercial success (1983–1989) 
Castles in the Sand would be a huge comeback for Coe, peaking at No. 8 on the country albums chart, his highest showing since Once Upon a Rhyme hit the same mark eight years earlier. Its success was spurred on by "The Ride", which was released in February 1983 as the lead single from the album and reached No. 1 on the June 4 Cashbox Country Singles Chart. It spent 19 weeks on the Billboard country singles charts, reaching a peak of No. 4 and hitting No. 2 on the Canadian RPM Country Tracks chart. The ballad tells the first-person story of a hitchhiker's encounter with the ghost of Hank Williams, Sr. in a ride from Montgomery, Alabama, to Nashville, Tennessee. The mysterious driver, 'dressed like 1950, half drunk and hollow-eyed', questions the narrator whether he has the musical talent and dedication to become a star in the country music industry. The song's lyrics place the events on U.S. Route 31 or the largely parallel Interstate 65. Buoyed by the single, Castles in the Sand became the mainstream breakthrough that Coe and producer Billy Sherrill had been trying for since the decade began. 1984's Just Divorced contains Coe's second biggest chart hit, "Mona Lisa Lost Her Smile", which rose to No. 2 on the Billboard country singles chart and No. 3 on Cashbox. In Canada, it reached No. 1 on the RPM Country Tracks charts dated for June 30, 1984.  The song is a mid-tempo ballad about a young blonde girl, featuring allusions to the iconic Da Vinci painting. The song features one of producer Billy Sherrill's most elaborate productions, with one critic commenting, 'The layered strings and organ work are slick, but they add such warmth and depth in contrast to Coe's voice that it works to devastating effect.'  Another track, “Missin’ the Kid,” finds a father lamenting the loss of his daughter, who now lives with his estranged ex-wife.  Over a languid beat and using simple language, Coe delivers a stunning vocal that expresses with weary resignation the bitterness, guilt, and extreme sadness that comes with a broken family. Beginning with the line, “I still can’t believe after all of these years I still miss you,’ the narrator wonders what his wife will tell their daughter when she asks about him, and finally declares:

I tell myself that it’s best if I don’t try to see her
Seeing her now could not make up for all she’s been through
Watching two people she once called her mother and father
Acting like strangers, that’s something I just could not do

In his AllMusic review of the album, writer Thom Jurek writes:

"She Used to Love Me a Lot", was released in December 1984 and peaked at No.  11 on both the US Billboard Hot Country Singles chart and the Canadian RPM Country Tracks chart. (A version of the song by Johnny Cash was recorded in the early 1980s, but remained unreleased until 2014.) The song tells of a chance meeting between two ex-lovers at 'the Silver Spoon Café', but when the man tries to rekindle the romance, she dismisses him in the same cavalier way he did her years earlier. It was written by Dennis Morgan, Charles Quillen, and Kye Fleming, as Coe - who continued to write songs of high quality - nonetheless relied on outside writers to get him in the charts. The 1986 album Son of the South would include contributions from fellow outlaw legends Nelson, Jennings, and Jessi Colter. His final recording for Columbia, the concept album A Matter of Life…and Death, was released in 1987.

 Later career (1990–present) 

In 1990, Coe reissued his independent albums Nothing Sacred and Underground Album on compact disc, as well as the compilation 18 X-Rated Hits. Throughout the 1990s, Coe had a successful career as a concert performer in the United States and Europe. In 1999, Coe met Pantera guitarist Dimebag Darrell in Fort Worth, Texas, and the two musicians, struck by the similarity of the approaches between country and heavy metal, agreed to work together, and began production on an album.  In 2000, Coe toured as the opening act for Kid Rock, and The New York Times published an article by journalist Neil Strauss, who described the material on Nothing Sacred and Underground Album as "among the most racist, misogynist, homophobic, and obscene songs recorded by a popular songwriter".  Coe maintains that he wrote to Strauss during the writing of the article, but the journalist did not acknowledge any interaction between the two, only stating that Coe's manager refused to speak on the record.

In 2003, Coe wrote a song for Kid Rock, "Single Father", which appeared on Kid Rock's self-titled album, and was released as a single, which peaked at number 50 on the Billboard Country Singles chart.  Rebel Meets Rebel, with Dimebag Darrell, Vinnie Paul, and Rex Brown, recorded sporadically between 1999 and 2003, was released in 2006, two years after Darrell's murder. AllMusic described it as a "groundbreaking" country metal album.

In the 2006 video "God's Gonna Cut You Down", Coe introduces Johnny Cash as the Man in Black. The video, directed by Tony Kaye, was released in connection with Cash's cover of the song in American V: A Hundred Highways.

In 2017, he was featured singing "Take This Job" on the album Baptized in Bourbon by the Moonshine Bandits. He also sings in the video.

 Outlaw origins 

Coe's integrity was called into question after his previous claim that he had spent time on death row for killing an inmate who tried to rape him was debunked when a Texas documentarian discovered Coe had done time for possessing burglary tools and indecent materials – but never murder. Criticisms such as these notwithstanding, Coe always maintained he was integral to the outlaw country movement getting its name, stating in 2003:

 Coe was uncompromising when it came to his lifestyle and language, even though it kept him off country playlists and award shows. For example, "The House We've Been Calling Home", from the 1977 album Rides Again, explores the theme of polygamy ('me and my wives have been spending our lives in a house we've been calling a home...'), while on the final cut on the album, "If That Ain't Country (I’ll Kiss Your Ass)", Coe utters a racial slur on record for the first time, singing the line 'workin' like a nigger for my room and board'. The song paints a picture of a Texas family that verges on caricature, with the narrator describing his tattooed father as 'veteran proud' and deeming his oldest sister 'a first-rate whore'. The song further alienated Coe from the country mainstream and kick-started accusations that he was a racist, a charge he always vehemently denied. In 2004 he remarked:

The cover of the 1986 release Son of the South, which displayed Coe holding a baby with a Confederate flag draped over his shoulders, galled many industry insiders, although Coe did print a message on the back of the album to defuse any potential backlash:

In another interview, Coe said, "Anyone that would look at me and say I was a racist, would have to be out of their mind. I have dreadlocks down to my waist with earrings in both ears and my beard is down to my waist and it is in braids...I was in prison with 87% black people, I hung around with black people, and I learned to sing music with black people. It was ironic that in prison the white guys called me a 'nigger lover' and now I write the word 'nigger' in a song and I am all of a sudden a racist. It is pretty ironic."

 Underground albums 

While Coe lived in Key West, Shel Silverstein played his comedy album Freakin' at the Freakers Ball for Coe, spurring him to perform his own comedic songs for Silverstein, who encouraged Coe to record them, leading to the production of the independently released Nothing Sacred. Jimmy Buffett accused Coe of plagiarizing the melody of "Divers Do It Deeper" from Buffett's "Changes in Latitudes, Changes in Attitudes", stating, "I would have sued him, but I didn't want to give Coe the pleasure of having his name in the paper." In response to the success of Buffett's song, Coe wrote a song insulting Buffett, and it appeared on Nothing Sacred. The album was released by mail order in 1978, through the back pages of the biker magazine Easyriders.

Coe's 1979 Columbia album Spectrum VII contained a note stating "Jimmy Buffett does not live in Key West anymore", a lyric from a song from Nothing Sacred. The album's songs are profane, often sexually explicit, and describe an orgy in Nashville's Centennial Park and sex with pornographic film star Linda Lovelace. The album also contains a song targeting Anita Bryant, a musician notable for her strong opposition to LGBT rights, specifically her fight to repeal an LGBT anti-discrimination ordinance in Miami-Dade County. In the song, bluntly titled "Fuck Aneta Briant" , Coe calls out Bryant as being hypocritical for her opposition to the lifestyles of gay people, stating that "In fact Anita Bryant, some act just like you".

In 1982, Coe released another independent album, Underground Album, which contained his most controversial song, "Nigger Fucker". Written from the perspective of a man whose lover left him for an African American man, the sexually explicit song resulted in Coe being accused of racism. Primarily because of this song, the material recorded by singer and white supremacist Johnny Rebel has also been mistakenly attributed to Coe. (Rebel, whose real name is Clifford Joseph Trahan, died in 2016.)  AllMusic, which did not review Underground Album, gave it three out of five stars. Coe responded to the accusations by saying "Anyone that hears this album and says I'm a racist, is full of shit." Coe's drummer, Kerry Brown, is black and married to a white woman. Brown is the son of legendary blues musician Clarence "Gatemouth" Brown. When asked about Coe's X-rated albums, Brown stated “David Allan Coe was controversial. Some of the songs are really out there. But it's my life. When you live in the David Allan Coe world, you learn to be controversial.

 Bankruptcy 

Like Willie Nelson and Jerry Lee Lewis, Coe has battled the IRS costing him the publishing rights to his compositions, including "Take This Job and Shove It". He stated in 2003:

In another interview, Coe added, "All the songs on the X-rated albums were sold. I don't own that stuff anymore. I have nothing to do with that stuff. They have to give me credit as the songwriter, but I don't make one cent."

Musical style

Coe's musical style derives from blues, rock, and country music traditions. His vocal style is described as a 'throaty baritone'. His lyrical content is often humorous or comedic, with William Ruhlmann describing him as a 'near-parody of a country singer'. Stephen Thomas Erlewine describes Coe as "a great, unashamed country singer, singing the purest honky-tonk and hardest country of his era […] he may not be the most original outlaw, but there is none more outlaw than him".

Coe's lyrics frequently include references to alcohol and drug use, and are often boisterous and cocky. Coe's debut album Penitentiary Blues was described as "voodoo blues" and "redneck music" by Allmusic's Thom Jurek. It focused on themes such as working for the first time, blood tests from veins used to inject heroin, prison time, hoodoo imagery, and death. The album's influences included Charlie Rich, Jerry Lee Lewis, Bo Diddley, Lightnin' Hopkins, and Tony Joe White. Coe later explained to Kristofer Engelhardt of Review: "I didn't really care for some of the country music until people like Kris Kristofferson and some of those people started writing songs. They had a little more to say than just, 'Oh baby I miss you', or whatever. I don't do anything halfway. Once I got into country music, I went back and researched it, and learned everything there was to know about it. I could do impersonations of Roy Acuff, Ernest Tubb, Hank Snow, Marty Robbins, just about anybody. I knew just about all there was to know about country music."

Coe's first country album, The Mysterious Rhinestone Cowboy, has been described as alt-country, 'pre-punk' and "a hillbilly version of Marc Bolan's glitz and glitter". Credited influences on the album include Merle Haggard. In his early career, Coe was known for his unpredictable live performances, in which he would ride a Harley-Davidson motorcycle onto the stage and curse at his audience. Coe has also performed in a rhinestone suit and a mask which resembled that of the Lone Ranger, calling himself the 'Mysterious Rhinestone Cowboy'.

The album Rebel Meets Rebel featured a song, "Cherokee Cry", which criticizes the United States government's treatment of Native Americans. When asked why he did not write more political songs, Coe replied, "I live in my own world, not thee world. I just write songs about what affects me in everyday life. At one point I wrote a song that was sort of a protest about when they were talking about drafting women into the military. It was about my son making it past the draft, but my daughter didn't. And I've done Farm Aid."

In his review of Coe's 1987 album A Matter of Life...and Death, Allmusic's Thom Jurek wrote, "Coe may have had some hits, but it is records like this that make one wonder if there was not a conspiracy to marginalize him and make him fail. Coe is a brilliant songwriter well into the 21st century, and deserves to be lauded along with the likes of [Willie] Nelson and [Waylon] Jennings and Kristofferson and Newbury – and even Cash."
Discography

Bibliography
 Just for the Record... the Autobiography The Book of David Ex-Convict Poems, Prose and Short Stories Psychopath Whoopsy Daisy'' (audio book)

References

External links

1939 births
Living people
American male singer-songwriters
American country singer-songwriters
People from Key West, Florida
Singer-songwriters from Ohio
King Records artists
Obscenity controversies in music
Outlaw country singers
Country musicians from Ohio
American country guitarists
American male guitarists
Singer-songwriters from North Carolina
Singer-songwriters from Florida
Guitarists from North Carolina
Guitarists from Ohio
Outlaws Motorcycle Club